Liu Yu (born September 15, 1991) is a Chinese baseball pitcher who plays with the Beijing Tigers in the China Baseball League. 

Liu represented China at the 2012 Asia Series, 2012 Asian Baseball Championship, 2013 East Asian Games, 2013 World Baseball Classic, 2014 Asian Games, 2015 Asian Baseball Championship, 2015 Summer Universiade, 2017 World Baseball Classic and 2018 Asian Games.

References

1991 births
Living people
Asian Games competitors for China
Chinese expatriate baseball players in the United States
Baseball pitchers
Baseball players at the 2018 Asian Games
Beijing Tigers players
Baseball players at the 2014 Asian Games
Texas AirHogs players
2013 World Baseball Classic players
2017 World Baseball Classic players